The 1916 Arkansas gubernatorial election was held on November 7, 1916.

Incumbent Democratic Governor George Washington Hays did not seek a third term.

Democratic nominee Charles Hillman Brough defeated Republican nominee Wallace Townsend and Socialist nominee William Davis with 69.44% of the vote.

Democratic primary

The Democratic primary election was held on March 29, 1916.

Candidates

Declared
Charles Hillman Brough, former professor at the University of Arkansas
Earle W. Hodges, incumbent Secretary of State of Arkansas
Lewis Cass "Shotgun" Smith, judge

Withdrew
Thomas Chipman McRae, former U.S. Representative

Results

Contemporary sources indicate the vote was higher than stated here, with one stating the official vote was Brough 59,676, Smith 44,024, Hodges 41,456.

General election

Candidates
Charles Hillman Brough, Democratic
Wallace Townsend, Republican, attorney
William Davis, Socialist

Results

References

Bibliography
 
 

1916
Arkansas
Gubernatorial
November 1916 events